V is a letter.

V may also refer to:

Arts, entertainment and media

People and fictional characters
 V, a character of Devil May Cry
V. Balakumaran (Tamil activist), a top leader of the Eelam Revolutionary Organisation of Students (EROS) in Sri Lanka
 V (character), the protagonist of the comic book and film V for Vendetta 
 V, the narrator of Vladimir Nabokov's novel The Real Life of Sebastian Knight
 V, the protagonist of the video game Cyberpunk 2077

Film and television 
 V (franchise), a science fiction franchise 
 V (1983 miniseries)
 V (2009 TV series), a remake
 V: The Final Battle, 1984
 V (1984 TV series)
 V (TV network), now Noovo, in Québec, Canada
 V (Australian TV channel), or [V]
 Channel [V], in Asia
  V (2020 film), an Indian Telugu action thriller 
  V (2021 film), an Indian Tamil horror drama

Gaming
 V (video game), based on the 1984 TV series

Literature
 "V" (poem), by Tony Harrison, 1985
 V (American magazine), launched in 1999
 V (Finnish magazine), 2006–2007
 V., a 1963 novel by Thomas Pynchon
 V: The Second Generation, a 2008 novel based TV series
 V, the Vespasian manuscript of the Anglian collection

Music 
 V (group), a British boyband
 V (singer) (Kim Tae-hyung, born 1995), South Korean vocalist of BTS
 V (Vlad Radovanov, born c. 1971), American rapper in duo V & Legacy
 V Festival, an annual British music festival
 V Festival (Australia)
 "V" (Lee Jung-hyun song), 2013

Albums 
 V (Fate album) (2006)
 V (Havok album) (2020)
 V (Hiroyuki Sawano album), 2023
 V (jj album) (2014)
 V (Karma to Burn album) (2011)
 V (Legião Urbana album) (1991)
 V (Live album) (2001)
 V (Maroon 5 album) (2014)
 V (Saint Vitus album) (1990)
 V (Scale the Summit album) (2015)
 V (Spock's Beard album) (2000)
 V (The Bronx album), 2017
 V (The Fucking Champs album) (2002)
 V (The Horrors album) (2017)
 V (Van She album) (2008)
 V (Vanessa Hudgens album) (2006)
 V (Unknown Mortal Orchestra album) (2023)
 V (Wavves album) (2015)
 V. (album), by Wooden Shjips (2018)
 Five (Hollywood Undead album) (stylized as V)(2017)
 V: The New Mythology Suite (2000), by Symphony X
 V Live (album), a 2007 live album by Vitalic
 V, a 2019 album by Aaron Goodvin
 V, a cancelled album by Jonas Brothers
 V, a 1991 album by Steady B
 V, a 2016 album by Truckfighters
 V, a shelved album by Vanessa Amorosi
 V, a 2011 album by Vreid

Businesses and organizations
 Visa Inc., American financial services corporation whose stock ticker is V
 Ⓥ, symbol of Norwegian alcoholic beverage retailer Vinmonopolet
 Left Party (Sweden) (Vänsterpartiet), abbreviated V
 Venstre (Denmark), a political party, symbol V
 Venstre (Norway), a political party, symbol V

Language, grammar, linguistics and symbology
 V, Roman numeral for 5
 v, the symbol used in the International Phonetic Alphabet for the voiced labiodental fricative
 V sign, a hand gesture
 ∨, descending wedge
 v., abbreviation of von in German surnames
 v., abbreviation for versus used in legal case citation
 Verb, a part of speech
 Ⓥ, an enclosed alphanumeric
 ⓥ, a food label under vegetarian and vegan symbolism

Science and technology

Biology
 ATC code V (Various), a section of the Anatomical Therapeutic Chemical Classification System
 Haplogroup V (mtDNA), a human mitochondrial DNA haplogroup
 Trigeminal nerve, the fifth cranial nerve, or CN V
 Valine, an α-amino acid 
 V-moth, the moth Macaria wauaria

Mathematics
 Von Neumann universe in set theory
 Verschiebung operator in algebraic group theory

Physics
 V band, the band of frequencies from 40 to 75 GHz
 , voltage, an electric potential difference in a circuit
 V, Volt, an SI unit 
 Red projection in the YUV color encoding system
 , velocity
 V number, the normalized frequency of an optical fiber

Computing
 V (operating system), 1981–1988
 V (programming language)
 V-Model, a model for a software development process
 V, in Semaphore (programming)

Other uses in science and technology
 Vanadium, symbol V, a chemical element
 V engine, an internal combustion engine configuration

Other uses 
 V (drink), an energy drink
 V (Los Angeles Railway), a streetcar service 1920–1963
 V (New York City Subway service), a former New York City Subway service
 "V" device, an American military medal ribbon award
 V formation, of birds and airplanes
 Victor, military time zone for UTC−09
 Cadillac V series, high-performance vehicles
 Eve Ensler (born 1953), known mononymously as V, American playwright and activist
 Le V, a hotel in Montreal, Quebec, Canada

See also
 V de V (disambiguation)
 VEE (disambiguation)
 versus (disambiguation)
 vs (disambiguation)
 V series (disambiguation)
 V for Vendetta (disambiguation)
 "V" Is for Vengeance, a novel
 5 (disambiguation)
 VVVVVV, a 2010 video game by Terry Cavanagh